The following is a list of notable  Chinese-speaking/writing actors. Their nationality can be PRC (Mainland China, Hong Kong, Macau), Taiwan or any other country. This list does not include actresses.

B
 Bai Jingting
 Bai Yu

C
 William Chan
 Jackie Chan
 Sunny Chan
 Brandon Chang
 Chen Baoguo
 Chen Daoming
 Calvin Chen
 Edison Chen
 Jaycee Chan
 Kelly Chen
 Chen Xiao
 Chen Xuedong
 Ekin Cheng
 Joe Cheng
 Leslie Cheung
 David Chiang
 Chin Han
 Jay Chou
 Stephen Chow
 Chow Yun-fat
 Wu Chun

D
Deng Chao
Deng Lun
Darren Chen
Dylan Wang
Ding Yuxi

G
 Ge You
 Guo Junchen
 Gong Jun

H
 Mike He
 Huang Xiao Ming
 Huang Zitao
 Hu Ge
 Hu Jun
 Hu Yanbin
 Hu Yitian
 Wallace Huo
 Huang Junjie

J
 Jet Li
 Josie Ho
 Jia Hongsheng
 Hu Ge
 Sammo Hung
 Tao Jin

K
 Ella Koon
 Rosamund Kwan
 Shirley Kwan
 Kenix Kwok
Kris Wu

L
 Michael Lam 
 Raymond Lam
 Leon Lai
 Andy Lau
 Hawick Lau
 Bruce Lee
 Brandon Lee
 Aarif Lee
Leo Luo
 Ken Leung
 Tony Leung Chiu Wai
 Jet Li
 Li Xian
 Li Yifeng
 Lin Yi
 Jimmy Lin
 Bernice Liu
 Liu Haoran
 Tao Liu 
 Liu Ye
 Gallen Lo
 Zihan Loo
 Lu Han
 Li Hongyi
 Leon Zhang
 Leo Wu

M
Ma Ke
 Karen Mok
 Anita Mui
Ma Tianyu

N
 Neo Hou
Kary Ng
 Richard Ng Man Tat
 Nicky Tirta
 Sandra Ng
 Rachel Ngan

P
 Eddie Peng
 Will Pan
 Pan Yueming
 Byron Pang
 Diana Pang
 Jenny Pat
 Kaden Pang

Q
 Qin Hao

R
 Selina Ren
 Michelle Reis
Riley Wang
 Ruan Lingyu, silent-film actress

S
Charmaine Sheh
Xiao Shenyang
Shu Qi
Fiona Sit
Maggie Siu
Alec Su
Betty Sun
Song Weilong

T
 Hebe Tian
 Leila Tong
 Tang Guoqiang
 Stephy Tang
 Nicholas Tse
 Angela Tong
 Tang Xiaotian

V
 Vin Zhang

W

 Jiro Wang
 Wang Gang
 Wang Baoqiang (王宝强, Vương Bảo Cường)
 Wang Yibo
 Bosco Wong
 Race Wong
 Chun Wu 
 Daniel Wu
 Wu Yifan

X
Xu Zheng
Xu Shaohua
Xiong Ziqi
Xu Kai
Xiao Zhan
Xing Zhao Lin

Y
 Aaron Yan
 Jerry Yan
 Donnie Yen Ji Dan
 Shawn Yue
 Yuen Biao
 Yang Yang
 Jackson Yee

Z
Dan Zhao
Zhang Fengyi
Zhang Guoli
Zhang Han
Zhang Jie
Tielin Zhang
Jacky Cheung
Zhang Yimou
Zhang Yixing
Junli Zheng
Vic Zhou
Ken Zhu
Zhu Yawen
Zhang Ruoyun
Zhu Yilong
Zhu Zanjin
Zhang Zhehan

See also
List of Chinese actresses

Actors